Moritz Balthasar Borkhausen (3 December 1760, Giessen – 30 November 1806, Darmstadt) was a German naturalist and forester.

He received his education in Giessen, and in 1796 started work as an assessor at the forestry office in Darmstadt. In 1800, he attained the title of Kammerrat, followed by a role as counselor at the Oberforsthaus Collegium in 1804.

As a botanist, he was the taxonomic author of Alliaceae and Asclepiadaceae as well as the circumscriber of numerous plant genera and species.

Works
Naturgeschichte der europäischen Schmetterlinge (Natural history of European Lepidoptera) (1788–94).
Versuch einer Erklärung der zoologischen Terminologie (An explanation of the zoological terminology) (1790).
Versuch einer forstbotanischen Beschreibung der in Hessen-Darmstädter Landen im Freien wachsenden Holzarten (Description of the woody plants growing in Hesse-Darmstadt) (1790).
Tentamen dispositionis plantarum Germaniae seminiferarum secundum new fact methodum A staminum situ proportione, (1792).
 *Theoretisch-praktisches Handbuch der Forstbotanik und Forsttechnologie (Manual of forest technology) (1800–1803).
Deutsche Ornithologie oder Naturgeschichte aller Vögel Deutschlands (Natural history of German birds) (1810).

References

Bibliography 
Robert Zander; Fritz Encke, Günther Buchheim, Siegmund Seybold (Hrsg.): Handwörterbuch der Pflanzennamen. 13.Auflage. Ulmer Verlag, Stuttgart 1984, .

External links 
 Botanisches Wörterbuch, at BSB

1760 births
1807 deaths
People from Giessen
18th-century German zoologists
German foresters
German lepidopterists
19th-century German zoologists
18th-century naturalists
19th-century naturalists
German naturalists